FC Chertanovo-2 Moscow is a Russian football team from Moscow. It is the farm-club for FC Chertanovo Moscow.

History
Following FC Chertanovo Moscow's promotion to the second-tier Russian National Football League at the end of the 2017–18 season, the club decided to organize a farm-club. It was licensed to play in the third-tier Russian Professional Football League for the 2018–19 season. It took the last place in the league and didn't participate in the PFL for the 2019–20 season.

References

Association football clubs established in 2018
Football clubs in Moscow
2018 establishments in Russia